Simaba cedron, the cedron, is a member of the quassia family, Simaroubaceae, native to Colombia and Central America.

References

External links
Cedron
Cedron

Simaroubaceae
Trees of Aruba
Trees of Colombia
Trees of Paraguay